Berrima may refer to:

 Berrima, New South Wales, a village in the Southern Highlands district on the old Hume Highway between Canberra and Sydney, Australia.
 Berrima Correctional Centre, an Australian female prison located at Berrima, New South Wales, Australia.
 Berrima Parish, a parish of the County of Camden in the Southern Highlands region of New South Wales, Australia.
 Berrima railway line, partly closed private railway line in New South Wales, Australia
 HMAS Berrima

See also
 Berrimah (disambiguation)
 New Berrima, New South Wales